Trupanea nudipes is a species of fruit fly in the genus Trupanea of the family Tephritidae.

Distribution
Brazil.

References

Tephritinae
Insects described in 1938
Diptera of South America